St. Paul's Episcopal Church is a historic Episcopal church in Hanover Courthouse, Virginia, United States. It was built in 1895, and is a one-story, frame building in the Late Gothic Revival style. It has a brick foundation and weatherboard siding with symmetrically placed lancet windows.  The front facade features a protruding bell tower in the center with two flanking lancet windows. The church is connected at the northeast corner to an addition used for offices and classrooms, that was built in the 1930s.  Another addition was built in the 1960s.

It was listed on the National Register of Historic Places in 1994.

References

External links

St. Paul's Episcopal Church website

19th-century Episcopal church buildings
Carpenter Gothic church buildings in Virginia
Churches completed in 1895
Churches in Hanover County, Virginia
Episcopal churches in Virginia
National Register of Historic Places in Hanover County, Virginia
Churches on the National Register of Historic Places in Virginia